Mir Hammal Kalmati is a Pakistani politician who was a Member of the Provincial Assembly of Balochistan, from 2008 to May 2018.

Early life 
He was born on 25 September 1979.

Political career
He was elected to the Provincial Assembly of Balochistan as a candidate of Pakistan Muslim League (Q) from Constituency PB-51 Gwadar in 2008 Pakistani general election. He received 15,343 votes and defeated an independent candidate, Ashraf.

In 2008 , He Was Appointed As The Minister Of Fisheries Balochistan And Remained In Office Till 2013

He was re-elected to the Provincial Assembly of Balochistan as a candidate of Balochistan National Party (Mengal) (BNP-M) from Constituency PB-51 Gwadar in 2013 Pakistani general election. He received 13,944 votes and defeated Yaqoob Bizanjo.

He was re-elected to Provincial Assembly of Balochistan as a candidate of BNP-M from Constituency PB-51 (Gwadar) in 2018 Pakistani general election.

He received 31,248 votes and again defeated Yaqoob Bizanjo

References

Living people
Balochistan MPAs 2013–2018
1979 births
Balochistan MPAs 2008–2013
Balochistan National Party (Mengal) MPAs (Balochistan)
Balochistan MPAs 2018–2023